Chamberí is a district of Madrid, Spain. It is further subdivided into six neighborhoods (Gaztambide, Arapiles, Trafalgar, Almagro, Ríos Rosas and Vallehermoso). The current urban outline was born as part of the Ensanche plan drafted by Carlos María de Castro (approved in 1860).

See also 
 Chamberí (Madrid Metro)
 Church of San Fermín de los Navarros
 Beti Jai fronton
 Hospital of Maudes
 Geological and Mining Institute of Spain
 School of Mining Engineering of Madrid
 Sorolla Museum

References
Citations

Bibliography

External links

 
Districts of Madrid